Marotsipoy is a rural village in the Analamanga Region, Madagascar, in the district of Anjozorobe.

It has a population of 6,056  inhabitants in 2019.

External links
 mindat.org

Populated places in Analamanga